Gelinören can refer to:

 Gelinören, Çal
 Gelinören, Kastamonu